Gon Shein Pyin Tae Chit Chin Take Khar is a 2006 Burmese drama film, directed by Daw Na starring Yan Aung, Htun Eaindra Bo, Sai Sai Kham Leng and Thet Mon Myint.

Cast
Yan Aung as Chit Oo
Htun Eaindra Bo as Sin Theingi
Sai Sai Kham Leng as Thet Nwe Oo
Thet Mon Myint as Pan Nu Wai
Nwet Nwet San as Daw Mi Mi Khin
Saw Naing as U Saw

Award

References

2006 films
2000s Burmese-language films
Burmese drama films
Films shot in Myanmar
2006 drama films